Nasty Habits is a 1977 British comedy film directed by Michael Lindsay-Hogg, starring Glenda Jackson, Melina Mercouri, Geraldine Page, Rip Torn and Susan Penhaligon. It is based on Muriel Spark's novel The Abbess of Crewe.

Plot
At the little-known and extremely wealthy Abbey of Philadelphia the Abbess, Sister Hildegard, is dying. She wishes her favorite, Sister Alexandra, to succeed her but dies moments before she can make her endorsement public. Alexandra conspires with Sisters Gertrude and Walburga to win the coming election, and to defeat her rival, Sister Felicity, who is openly carrying on an affair with a Jesuit priest, Father Thomas. Alexandra orders hidden microphones and cameras installed throughout the convent, and even hires a pair of Jesuit students, Gregory and Ambrose, to break in and steal Thomas's compromising letters from Sister Felicity's sewing box. The break-in is discovered, but the real meaning is kept hidden and Alexandra wins the election by a landslide. Once she is made Abbess, Alexandra expels and excommunicates Felicity, who begins a very public campaign to topple Alexandra. At the same time, the publicity brings the abbey to the attention of the Holy See, which discovers that the order is an unofficial one, with no actual ties to the Roman Catholic Church. To make matters worse, Gregory and Ambrose blackmail Gertrude and Walburga, who send the bungling Sister Winifred to pay them off only to have the whole scandal made public.

Parallels to the Watergate conspiracy
The film and the original novel were a satire on the presidency of Richard Nixon and the Watergate scandal, including Alexandra's parting line as she boards a plane to Rome to answer charges from the Vatican. The characters are parallels of the Nixon cabinet and Watergate conspirators.

 Sister Alexandra - Richard Nixon
 Sister Gertrude - Henry Kissinger
 Sister Prioress Walburga - H. R. Haldeman
 Sister Winifred - John Dean
 Sister Mildred, Mistress of Novices - John Ehrlichman
 Sister Geraldine - Gerald Ford
 Ambrose - E. Howard Hunt
 Gregory - G. Gordon Liddy

Cast

 Glenda Jackson as Sister Alexandra
 Melina Mercouri as Sister Gertrude
 Geraldine Page as Sister Prioress Walburga
 Sandy Dennis as Sister Winifred
 Anne Jackson as Sister Mildred, Mistress of Novices
 Anne Meara as Sister Geraldine
 Susan Penhaligon as Sister Felicity
 Edith Evans as Sister Hildegard

 Jerry Stiller as P.R. Priest
 Rip Torn as Father Maximilian
 Eli Wallach as Monsignor
 Harry Ditson as Ambrose
 Christopher Muncke as Gregory
 Anthony Forrest as Father Thomas
 Mike Douglas, Bill Jorgensen, Jessica Savitch, and Howard K. Smith as themselves

Reception
Vincent Canby in The New York Times wrote that Glenda Jackson had her best role in years, and that the film was "very funny" but was too uneven to be ultimately successful.

The film was released on VHS tape in 1989, and on DVD in 2014.

References

1977 films
1977 comedy films
British comedy films
Films directed by Michael Lindsay-Hogg
Films scored by John Cameron
Watergate scandal in film
1970s English-language films
1977 directorial debut films
1970s American films
1970s British films